Operation Klinker was a military operation in Angola during December 1983 by the South African Defence Force (SADF) and South African Air Force (SAAF) during the Angolan Civil War and South African Border War.

Background
The object of this operation was an attack on a People's Liberation Army of Namibia (PLAN) training base in Angola, intimidating them into a belief that the SADF could strike them anywhere and that it too could be a target of Operation Askari. The Tobias Hainyeko Training Centre was located close to the city of Lubango and was used to train PLAN recruits in various military fields. A special forces team had been deployed in the Lubango area between November and December 1983 to conduct reconnaissance. The raid took place on the morning of 29 December 1983, by four Buccaneer strike aircraft of 24 Squadron. Thirty two bombs were dropped by the SAAF aircraft, some exploded immediately while the rest were on delayed charges making the base temporally unusable.

References

Further reading
 
 
 
 

1983 in Angola
1983 in South Africa
Battles and operations of the South African Border War
Conflicts in 1983
Cross-border operations of South Africa
Military history of Angola
September 1983 events in Africa